Events from the year 1870 in Ireland.

Events
 19 May – the Home Government Association is established by Isaac Butt to argue for devolution for Ireland and repeal of the Act of Union.
27 August – White Star's first ocean liner RMS Oceanic is launched by Harland and Wolff in Belfast.
19 October –  is wrecked on Inishtrahull with the loss of 179 lives.
Landlord and Tenant (Ireland) Act 1870 passed in an attempt to secure greater security of tenure for landholders.
The building of Belfast Castle is completed, to a design by Charles Lanyon and his son.
Work is completed on the building of the Albert Memorial Clock, Belfast, as a memorial to Queen Victoria's late Prince Consort, Prince Albert.
First service is held in the new Saint Fin Barre's Cathedral, Cork (Church of Ireland).
Belfast Hebrew Congregation is established.

Arts and literature
 The Water Colour Society of Ireland is founded as the Amateur Drawing Society by an informal group of six well-connected women from County Waterford.

Sport

Births
 22 January – John B. Sheridan, Irish American sports journalist (died 1930 in the United States)
3 February – Beatrice Grimshaw, anthropologist (died 1953 in Australia).
8 February – Robert Pilkington, lawyer and politician in the Western Australian Legislative Assembly and House of Commons of the UK (died 1942 in England).
2 April – Edmund Dwyer-Gray, politician and 29th Premier of Tasmania in 1939 (died 1945 in Australia).
17 April – Robert Tressell, born Robert Croker, radical, author of The Ragged-Trousered Philanthropists (died 1911 in England).
5 May – Armar Lowry-Corry, 5th Earl Belmore, High Sheriff and Deputy Lieutenant of County Fermanagh (died 1948).
22 May – Eva Gore-Booth, poet, dramatist, suffragist, social worker and labour activist (died 1926 in London).
25 June – Erskine Childers, writer and nationalist (executed by Free State firing squad 1922 at Beggars Bush Barracks, Dublin).
8 July – R. A. Stewart Macalister, archaeologist (died 1950).
16 July – Lambert McKenna, Jesuit priest and writer (died 1956).
16 September – John Boland, Nationalist politician, MP and Olympic tennis gold medallist (died 1958 in England).
10 October – Frank Lawless, Sinn Féin TD, member of the 1st Dáil and the 2nd Dáil (died 1922).
19 November – William MacCarthy-Morrogh, cricketer (died 1939).
November – Thomas Moles, Ulster Unionist MP (died 1937).
5 December – John O'Connor, priest (died 1952 in England).
Undated – P. T. Daly, trade unionist (died 1943).

Deaths
17 March – John Keegan Casey, "poet of the Fenians" (born 1846).
25 April – Daniel Maclise, painter (born 1806).
c. May – John Skipton Mulvany, architect (born 1813).
31 May – Chartres Brew, Gold commissioner, Chief Constable and judge in the Colony of British Columbia (born 1815).
7 September – Hugh Talbot Burgoyne, recipient of the Victoria Cross for gallantry in 1855 in the Sea of Azov, Crimea (born 1833).
23 September – Thomas McCarthy, businessman and politician in Quebec (born 1832).
20 October – Michael William Balfe, composer (born 1808).
9 December – Patrick MacDowell, sculptor (born 1799).
12 December – Martin Cregan, portrait painter (born 1788).

References

 
1870s in Ireland
Ireland
Years of the 19th century in Ireland
 Ireland